Norman Morris (9 May 1907 – 15 July 1982) was an Australian cricketer. He played four first-class matches for New South Wales in 1928/29.

See also
 List of New South Wales representative cricketers

References

External links
 

1907 births
1982 deaths
Australian cricketers
New South Wales cricketers
Cricketers from Sydney